Andreas Wellinger (born 28 August 1995) is a German ski jumper. His career-best achievements include winning an individual gold medal at the 2018 Winter Olympics, individual silver at the 2018 Winter Olympics, mixed team gold at the 2017 Ski Jumping World Championships, and team silver at the 2016 Ski Flying World Championships. Wellinger's best finish in the World Cup overall standings is fourth, in the 2016/17 season.

Career
Wellinger's debut in FIS Ski Jumping World Cup took place in 2012 on competition on small hill in Lillehammer. He led after the first round, but in the second round he dropped to fifth place. The same year, he won the large hill team event in Kuusamo and got two individual podiums in Sochi and Engelberg as well. During the 2012/2013 season, he reached 393 points and finished in World cup in 20th place.

He won the summer Grand Prix FIS Ski Jumping in 2013, ahead of Slovene ski jumper Jernej Damjan. At the first competition in season 2013/2014 in Klingenthal, he was second and that was his third podium. In Engelberg, the same year, he also finished second. He ended the Four Hills Tournament in 10th place. Then he won in Wisla 2014.
He was on Germany's ski jumping 2014 Winter Olympics team. He was sixth on a small individual hill and won a gold medal with Germany in a team event. He ended 2013/2014 season in 9th place.
He started season 2014/2015 in Klingenthal with 3rd place. In Ruka he had a bad fall and broke his collarbone and next jumped on 6 March in Lahti.

2018: Winter Olympic Gametes
Andreas Wellinger won the gold medal in the Men's Normal Hill Individual Ski Jumping event at the Pyeongchang Winter Olympic Games. He also won the silver in the Men's Individual Large Hill Ski Jumping event, and another silver as part of the German Team in the Men's Team Ski Jumping event.

World Cup

Season standings

Wins

Record

Olympic results

World Championship results

FIS Ski Flying World Championships

See also
List of Olympic medalists in ski jumping
List of Youth Olympic Games gold medalists who won Olympic gold medals

External links

1995 births
Living people
German male ski jumpers
Ski jumpers at the 2014 Winter Olympics
Ski jumpers at the 2018 Winter Olympics
Olympic ski jumpers of Germany
Olympic gold medalists for Germany
Olympic silver medalists for Germany
Olympic medalists in ski jumping
Medalists at the 2014 Winter Olympics
Medalists at the 2018 Winter Olympics
Ski jumpers at the 2012 Winter Youth Olympics
FIS Nordic World Ski Championships medalists in ski jumping
People from Traunstein (district)
Sportspeople from Upper Bavaria
Youth Olympic gold medalists for Germany
21st-century German people